John B. Lindale House is a historic home located at Magnolia, Kent County, Delaware.  It was built in 1886, and is a two-story, frame dwelling, in the Queen Anne style.  It is almost square in plan, and features two-story bay windows, a large semi-circular projection, and polygonal turret towers.

It was listed on the National Register of Historic Places in 1973.

As of January 2014, it was listed for sale for $150,000.00.  It sold in February 2015 for $80,000.

References

External links

Houses on the National Register of Historic Places in Delaware
Queen Anne architecture in Delaware
Houses completed in 1886
Houses in Kent County, Delaware
Historic American Buildings Survey in Delaware
National Register of Historic Places in Kent County, Delaware